Kirsty Anele Smith (born 6 January 1994) is a Scottish footballer who plays as a defender for English Women's Super League club West Ham United and the Scotland national team.

Club career

Hibernian
Smith started her career at Musselburgh Windsor. In July 2007, she joined Hibernian. Smith was part of the side that won consecutive Scottish domestic cup doubles in 2016 and 2017, and also finished as league runners-up on 4 occasions between 2013 and 2017.

Manchester United

On 27 June 2018, it was announced that Smith and teammate Lizzie Arnot were leaving Hibernian. Both players then signed with Manchester United for their inaugural season. She made her competitive debut for Manchester United in a 1–0 League Cup victory against Liverpool on 19 August, and her Championship debut in a 12–0 win against Aston Villa on 9 September. Smith made 16 league appearances as United won the Championship title and promotion to the FA WSL in their first season.

In the 2019–20 season, Smith scored her first goal for the club on 21 November 2019 in an 11–1 League Cup Group Stage victory over Championship team Leicester City.

West Ham United
On 15 July 2022, it was announced that Smith had signed a two-year deal with West Ham United, with the option to extend for a further year.

International career
Smith has represented Scotland at under-17 and under-19 level. Her UEFA competition debut for Scotland under-17 was on 9 April 2011 against France under-17.

On 30 October 2014, Smith earned her senior international debut, in a World Cup qualification play-off against the Netherlands. She was a 79th minute substitute, coming on for Caroline Weir.

On 15 May 2019, Smith was named in the Scotland squad for the 2019 FIFA Women's World Cup, the nation's first ever appearance at the tournament.

Personal life
In 2017, Smith graduated with a degree in Accountancy and Finance from Heriot-Watt University.

Honours
Hibernian
 Scottish Women's Cup: 2016, 2017
 Scottish Women's Premier League Cup: 2016, 2017, 2018

Manchester United
 FA Women's Championship: 2018–19

References

External links 

 Profile at the Manchester United F.C. website
 
 
 

1994 births
Living people
Alumni of Heriot-Watt University
Scottish women's footballers
Scotland women's international footballers
Hibernian W.F.C. players
Manchester United W.F.C. players
Women's Super League players
Scottish Women's Premier League players
Women's association football defenders
2019 FIFA Women's World Cup players
Sportspeople from Musselburgh
Footballers from East Lothian
UEFA Women's Euro 2017 players